Ullapara is an upazila in Sirajganj District, Rajshahi Division, Bangladesh. It is known as the gateway to North Bengal, since the Dhaka-Rangpur and Dhaka-Rajshahi highways intersect at Hatikumrul in Ullapara.

History
Around 4500 BC, the region of Varendra consisted of parts of Dinajpur, Joypurhat, Bogra, Rajshahi and western Pabna. Pabna and Mymensingh were formed by the deposition of alluvial river soil. At that time, there was no Jamuna River, and Sirajganj and Tangail were part of Mymensingh. According to the Chinese traveler Xuanzang, Sirajgonj was inhabited for seven centuries before the Jamuna began to separate the region from the rest of Mymensingh. At that time, the new region was underwater for eight or nine months of the year. According to Xuanzang, the west bank of the Karatoya River was in the kingdom of Pundravardhana; Ullapara was probably also in the kingdom at the time. The area was settled during the eras of Muslim administration (1204-1757) and the British Raj (1757-1947) before a business center was established. In 1875 a thana (police station) was built, and on July 2, 1983 Ullapara became an upazila.

Geography
The upazilas of Raiganj and Tarash are to the north of Ullapara, Tarash and Bhangura to the west, Faridpur and Shahjadpur to the south and Belkuchi and Kamarkhanda to the east.

Demographics
According to the 2001 Bangladesh census, Ullahoara has a population of 4,49,243; male constituted 231746, female 217497; Muslim 427986, Hindu 21205 and others 52.

In the 1991 Bangladesh census, Ullapara had a population of 5,40,156. Males were 51.13 percent of the population, and females 48.87 percent. The population aged 18 and older was 192,188. Ullapara had an average literacy rate of 39.61 percent (ages seven and older); males had a 44.81-percent literacy rate and females a 34.09-percent rate, compared to the national average of 82.4 percent.

Administration
Ullahpara Upazila is divided into Ullahpara Municipality and 13 union parishads: Bangala, Barahar, Bara Pangashi, Durganagar, Hatikumrul, Mohanpur, Panchakrushi, Purnimaganti, Ramkrishanpur, Salanga, Salap, Udhunia, and  Ullahpara. The union parishads are subdivided into 253 mauzas and 412 villages.

Ullahpara Municipality is subdivided into 9 wards and 25 mahallas.

Transport
Rivers were formerly the only effective routes of communication. The Dhaka-Rangpur highway and the Dhaka-Rajshahi railway connect the upazila (at the village of Newargacha) with other parts of Bangladesh. A road network exists, and the Bangabandhu Bridge over the Jamuna has reduced the overland travel time to Dhaka to about three hours.

Education
Ullapara's oldest secondary school, Salop High School (estabd. in 1905),the second oldest Ullapara Merchant's Pilot High English School, was founded in 1906 by the jute merchants of the small river port. Other schools are Kaliakoir Adarsha High School, Ullapara Science College, Government Akbar Ali College Barahar School & College, Barahar Hazi Abbus Ali Alim Madrasha, Barahar Primary School and K.A.M High School. Akbar Ali College, founded in 1970, was the upazila's first college. There are also some schools as Momena Ali Biggan School, Mohonpur KM Institution, Udhunia Manikjan High School, Ullapara Adarsha High School, Kayra High School & College, Kayra Fazil Madrasa, Dadpur High School, Kayra, Kayra Khadiza Saeed High School, and Pukurpar S & B Fazil Madrasha.

Notable residents 

 Hossain Toufique Imam, political adviser to Prime Minister Sheikh Hasina, lived in the upazila.
 Tanveer Imam, Member of Parliament, was elected from constituency Sirajganj-4 in 2014.
 Rajendra Lahiri, revolutionary, was born at Mohanpur village in 1892.
 Fateh Lohani, actor and journalist, stood for election to Parliament from Ullapara in 1973.
 Kamal Lohani, journalist, was born in Shantala in 1934.
 Abdul Latif Mirza was the Member of Parliament for constituency Sirajganj-4 from 1996 until 2001.
 Abdur Rashid Tarkabagish, parliamentarian, was born in Tarotia village in 1900.

See also
Districts of Bangladesh
Divisions of Bangladesh

References

Upazilas of Sirajganj District